The 2016 Première ligue de soccer du Québec season is the fifth season of play for the Première ligue de soccer du Québec; the highest level of soccer based in the Canadian province of Québec and one of two Division 3 semi-professional soccer leagues in the Canadian soccer pyramid (the other being League1 Ontario).

CS Mont-Royal Outremont was the defending champion from 2015 and won the title again this season.

Changes from 2015 
The league will again feature seven teams, as in 2015.

In December 2015, the league announced that FC L'Assomption-Lanaudière had dropped out of the league and that the club's regional soccer association, ARS Lanaudière, would field a new club in the PLSQ called FC Lanaudière. This club is meant to represent the whole Lanaudière region, and is supported by the association's 14 clubs, including L'Assomption-Lanaudière.

Teams 
The following seven teams will take part in the 2016 season:

Standings 
Each team plays 18 matches as part of the season; three against every other team in the league.  There are no playoffs; the first-place team is crowned as league champion at the end of the season and faces the League1 Ontario league champion in the Inter-Provincial Cup.

Cup 
The cup tournament is a separate contest from the rest of the season, in which all seven teams from the league take part, and is unrelated to the season standings.  It is not a form of playoffs at the end of the season (as is typically seen in North American sports), but is a competition running in parallel to the regular season (similar to the Canadian Championship or the FA Cup), albeit only for PLSQ teams.  All matches are separate from the regular season, and are not reflected in the season standings.

The 2016 PLSQ Cup will maintain the same format as the previous seasons, as a two-game aggregate knockout tournament with a single match final.  As defending champion, Lakeshore SC will obtain a bye for the first round.

First round 

FC Gatineau wins 5-2 on aggregate.

CS Mont-Royal Outremont wins 7-4 on aggregate.

AS Blainville wins 5-0 on aggregate.

Semifinals 

FC Gatineau wins 4-2 on aggregate.

AS Blainville wins 5-3 on aggregate.

Final

Inter-Provincial Cup Championship 
The Inter-Provincial Cup Championship was a two-legged home-and-away series between the league champions of League1 Ontario and the Première ligue de soccer du Québec – the only Division 3 men's semi-professional soccer leagues based fully within Canada.

CS Mont-Royal Outremont won 3–2 on aggregate

Statistics

Top Goalscorers 

Source:

Top Goalkeepers 

Minimum 450 minutes played.  Source:

Awards

Reserve Division
The league operated a reserve division.

References

External links

Premiere
Première ligue de soccer du Québec seasons